James Edward Pace (January 1, 1936 – March 4, 1983) was an American running back in the National Football League. He was also an All-American halfback who played for the University of Michigan Wolverines teams from 1955 to 1957.

Youth
Although he was born in Little Rock, Arkansas, Pace was raised in Grand Rapids, Michigan. He played sandlot football with Terry Barr. In high school, Pace was a football and track star from 1950 to 1954. In track, he ran a time of a 9.6 seconds in the 100 yard dash at Dunbar High School.

College

Pace attended the University of Michigan and played for the Michigan Wolverines football.  He was named the Most Valuable Player on the Michigan football team. He was also awarded the Chicago Tribune Silver Football as the Most Valuable Player in the Big Ten Conference. He also ran track at Michigan and won the Big Ten 60-yard indoor dash title. In 1957, he scored ten touchdowns: seven rushing, two receiving, and one punt return. He accumulated almost 800 yards of total offense in 1957 (664 rushing, 122 receiving and 98 on punt returns) and averaged 5.4 yards per carry rushing. In the 1957 Michigan-Ohio State game, Pace rushed for 164 yards and caught a 14-yard pass, which was at that time the Michigan record for rushing yards against Ohio State. Pace played in the 1957 East–West Shrine Game. He was also selected by the Associated Press as a first-team player on the 1957 College Football All-America Team.

Professional career
Pace was the eighth pick in the first round of the 1958 NFL Draft. but played just one season for the San Francisco 49ers. He later played for the Hamilton Tiger-Cats of the Canadian Football League before retiring in 1963.

After retiring from football, Pace was an AFL administrative assistant from 1964 to 1966, an Oakland football scout, an actor in TV commercials and a school administrator in Los Angeles. He died at age 47 in Culver City, California.

See also
 List of Michigan Wolverines football All-Americans

References

External links
NFL.com player page

1936 births
1983 deaths
American football running backs
Hamilton Tiger-Cats players
Michigan Wolverines football players
San Francisco 49ers players
Sportspeople from Little Rock, Arkansas
Sportspeople from Grand Rapids, Michigan
Players of American football from Grand Rapids, Michigan
African-American players of American football
African-American players of Canadian football
20th-century African-American sportspeople